Losmapimod (GW856553X) is an investigational drug being developed by Fulcrum Therapeutics for the treatment of facioscapulohumeral muscular dystrophy (FSHD); a phase III clinical trial is pending approval. Losmapimod selectively inhibits enzymes p38α/β mitogen-activated protein kinases (MAPKs), which are modulators of DUX4 expression and mediators of inflammation.

Potential treatment for FSHD 
Fulcrum Therapeutics, a Massachusetts-based biotechnology company, identified p38α/β MAPK inhibitors as potent suppressors of DUX4 expression, the de-suppression of which is accepted as the cause FSHD. Among p38α/β MAPK inhibitors, Fulcrum chose losmapimod as its preferred developmental candidate due to its "substantial and attractive preclinical and clinical data" from previous GlaxoSmithKline (GSK) clinical trials.

As Fulcrum discovered the potential utility of p38 MAPK inhibition in treating FSHD, a Saint Louis University (SLU) research group independently  arrived at the same conclusion. The SLU research group found that p38α and p38β isoforms independently contribute to DUX4 expression, which indicates potential gain in exploring isoform specific (p38α or p38β) inhibition to balance therapeutic effects with side effects.

A theoretical limitation of losmapimod is that p38 kinase inhibition could impair myogenesis, the opposite effect of what is desired. Facio Therapies, a Dutch pharmaceutical company with their own drug candidate for FSHD, announced that they had eliminated p38 kinase inhibitors (including losmapimod) as a developmental candidate because p38 kinase inhibitors resulted in impaired myotube formation on their drug development platform. Indeed, others have found that p38α abrogation impairs myotube formation. However, Fulcrum found that p38 kinase inhibition did not impair myotube fusion at levels sufficient for DUX4 reduction.

Fulcrum development timeline  
 March 2022: Fulcrum announced plan for a phase III clinical trial for treatment of FSHD, named REACH. Unlike the previous trial, the primary endpoint will be reachable workspace.
 June 2021: Results of a randomized controlled phase IIb clinical trial, named ReDUX4, showed statistically significant slowing of muscle function deterioration, albeit biomarkers were unchanged. Further trials are pending.
 March 2021: Fulcrum announced discontinuation of LOSVID due to challenges with enrollment and the rapidly evolving environment of COVID-19 treatment.
 June 2020: Fulcrum announced applying to the FDA to initiate a phase III clinical trial, LOSVID, for losmapimod in treatment of COVID-19. Recent evidence indicates that p38 MAPK inhibition could be therapeutic, possibly by attenuating the exaggerated inflammatory response following SARS-CoV-2 infection.
 January 2020: Fulcrum announced receiving orphan drug status for losmapimod.
 October 2019: Fulcrum announced preliminary results of their phase 1 clinical trial of losmapimod. Oral dosing of losmapimod demonstrated sustained muscle tissue drug concentrations that in preclinical in vitro studies had shown effective in reducing DUX4 levels.
 April 2019: Fulcrum acquired from GSK the global rights to losmapimod.

Historical Investigations 
Losmapimod was discovered and unsuccessfully developed by GSK for treating multiple medical conditions. Despite failing to prove efficacy, GSK clinical trials showed that losmapimod is generally well tolerated across more than 3,500 subjects.

GSK investigated losmapimod as a therapeutic for patients post-myocardial infarction (heart attack). Despite phase II clinical trials the phase IIIA clinical trial (LATITUDE) failed to show significantly improved clinical outcomes. In October 2015 GSK announced cancelling the planned phase IIIB trial, but would "evaluate all options for future development."

GSK investigated losmapimod as a therapeutic for COPD, but multiple phase II clinical trials failed to show that losmapimod improves exercise tolerance, lung function, arterial inflammation, endothelial function, or rate of COPD exacerbations in subjects with COPD. GSK terminated development of losmapimod for COPD in 2016.

GSK investigated losmapimod as a therapeutic for major depressive disorder (MDD) on the basis of depression being correlated with elevated pro-inflammatory cytokines. Phase II clinical trials failed to show a significant improvement in depression symptoms and biomarkers.

References 

Protein kinase inhibitors
Orphan drugs